El Patrón: Invencible (The Boss: Invincible), or simply Invencible, is the fourth studio album by Puerto Rican singer-songwriter Tito El Bambino, released on February 8, 2011 by Siente Music. It was produced by Urba & Monserrate, Nérol, Marioso, Mambo Kingz, and among others. It is considered to some fans as a part two to El Patrón. The album won the Latin Grammy Award for Best Contemporary Tropical Album in 2011.

Track listing

Re-Edition: Invencible 2012
Invencible 2012 is a re-edition of the album Invencible by the Puerto Rican reggaeton artist Tito El Bambino. The album was released on November 21, 2011 and contains new 5 songs. These songs are "Me Voy De La Casa", "Me Toca Celebrar", "Quiere Que Le Muestre", "No Está En Na'" and "Olvídate De Mí".

Track listing

Charts

Certification

Release history

References

Tito El Bambino albums
2011 albums
Latin Grammy Award for Best Contemporary Tropical Album